George Peterson Cockram, sometimes referred to as George Cochran (21 August 1870 – 25 April 1929), was a Scottish football pioneer who played for some of the first Catalan and Basque clubs in history, most notably Athletic Club (now known as Athletic Bilbao) between 1902 and 1904.

Although little has been recorded of his life, he was one of the most important figures in the amateur beginnings of football in Spain, playing a significant role in promoting football in Catalonia and then Bilbao. In Catalonia, he played as a forward for several experimental teams in the 1890s such as Barcelona Football Club and Torelló Foot-ball Association, and in Bilbao, he played as a midfielder for some of the earliest Basque clubs in existence in the early 1900s such as Bilbao FC and Athletic Club, winning the 1903 Copa del Rey with the latter.

Footballing career

Barcelona Football Club
Cockram was born in Bathgate on 21 August 1870. At some point in the early 1890s, the 20-year-old Cockram arrived in Barcelona. Work reasons bring him, like many other Britons who moved to the Catalan capital. In 1892, he meet James Reeves, who was recruiting football enthusiasts to create a well-organized football club, and Cockram joined him, having been impressed by his entrepreneurial spirit. Together with Reeves and some other pioneers in the city, they formed Barcelona Football Club in late 1892, and Cockram was crucial in its success.

This entity held the first known football match in the city, which was held at Hippodrome of Can Tunis on 25 December 1892. It remains unclear if he played in this match. However, he did play on 12 March 1893, in the historic match between a red team captained blue team captained by Reeves and a Blue team led by himself, and he led his team to a 2–1 victory with two goals from Catalans (Figueras and Barrié). Cockram appears in what is regarded to be the oldest photograph of a football team in Spain, these two sides before the match on 12 March, sitting alongside the captain of the rival team, Reeves. In 1894, a conflict between the club's members caused the entity to split into two groups, one led by Reeves and the other by Cockram and William MacAndrews, which led to the creation of Sociedad de Foot-Ball de Barcelona and Torelló Foot-ball Association respectively. In order to form the latter, Cockram's group had to move to Torelló to find and gather enough players to assemble two teams to start practicing football.

Torelló Foot-ball Association
Apart from training matches (Blues vs Reds), the Torelló society only played two matches in the 1894–95 season, both against Barcelona. The first match took place on 24 March 1895 and ended in an 8–3 local victory, and the result was attributed to the fact that Torelló played against the sun and against the wind and that their five forwards (or runners as the local press of the time called them) had trouble getting through Barcelona's strong and robust defenders. Torelló's goals were netted by Cochran, Englis and A. Tong. The second match was held in Torelló on 14 April, and according to the chronicles of the time, they disputed said "challenge" as an act of revenge, and this time victory smiled at those from Torelló with a 5–3 win. Remarkably, Cockram netted a hat-trick in the first half to give a 3–0 lead to his side, in an eventual 5–3 victory.

When James Reeves returned to the United Kingdom in the autumn of 1895, the Barcelona Football Society began to decline and around 1896 it seems to disappear. The Torelló society follows them to the grave. However, it is known that many of the players of the Barcelona and Torelló societies continued to practice football through other societies such as the Barcelona Velocipedistas Society, which used to organize football games and other typically English Sports, but such arrangements also seem to be gone by the end of 1896. At some point in the late 1890s, Cockram moves to Basque Country, presumably due to work reasons, living in Portugalete for a few years.

Bilbao Football Club
In 1901, together with fellow Britons George Langford, William Dyer, and Walter Evans, the 31-year-old Cockram was one of the British residents in Bilbao who joined the recently established Bilbao Football Club. At the end of 1901, the two most important clubs in the city were Bilbao FC and Athletic Club (now known as Athletic Bilbao), so a rivalry soon arose between them, and they played several friendlies at the Hippodrome of Lamiako. Cockram was one of the British who participated in what is now regarded as one of the first football rivalries in Spain, one that served as one of the drivers of football as a mass phenomenon in Bilbao since their duels aroused great expectation. On 19 January 1902, Cockram played in the first paid match held in Biscay, since the public was charged with a ticket price of 30 cents of a peseta. Bilbao FC lost 2–4.

Athletic Club
In 1903, Bilbao FC collapsed and its remaining members were officially absorbed by Athletic Club. Cockram played two competitive matches for Athletic between 1903 and 1904, including the 1903 Copa del Rey Final, in which he played alongside the likes of Alejandro de la Sota, fellow British Walter Evans, and club founders Juan Astorquia and Eduardo Montejo, the latter having also lived in Portugalete. Cockram was at the heart of a 3–2 comeback win over Madrid FC (now known as Real Madrid) in the final. He was also part of the team that won the 1904 Copa del Rey, which Athletic won without playing a single match since their opponents failed to turn up.

Death
He died on 25 April 1929, at the age of 58.

Honours
Athletic Club
Copa del Rey:
Winners (1): 1903 and 1904
Runner-up (1): 1905

References

1870 births
1929 deaths
Scottish footballers
Athletic Bilbao footballers
Association football midfielders
Association football forwards
Scottish expatriate footballers
Scottish expatriate sportspeople in Spain
Expatriate footballers in Spain